The Detroit Mercy Titans Men's Lacrosse team is a college lacrosse team that represents the University of Detroit Mercy (UDM) in Detroit, Michigan, United States. The school's teams are typically members of the Horizon League, but the men's lacrosse team is an associate member of the ASUN Conference, which it joined in July 2021 after having played in the Metro Atlantic Athletic Conference.

History

Conference affiliations
 Independent (2009)
 Metro Atlantic Athletic Conference (2010–2021)
 ASUN Conference (2022–present)

Year by year results

All-time coaching records

References

External links
 Official website

College men's lacrosse teams in the United States
ASUN Conference men's lacrosse